Hellen Wawira Kariuki (born 15 April 1992) is a Kenyan para powerlifter. She competed at the 2018 Commonwealth Games where she came 4th in the lightweight event. She won a bronze medal in the lightweight event at the 2022 Commonwealth Games.

References 

Kenyan powerlifters
Living people
1992 births
21st-century Kenyan women
Commonwealth Games bronze medallists for Kenya
Commonwealth Games medallists in powerlifting
Powerlifters at the 2018 Commonwealth Games
Powerlifters at the 2022 Commonwealth Games
Medallists at the 2022 Commonwealth Games